This is a list of legislation passed in response to the COVID-19 pandemic.

China 
 Decision of the Standing Committee of the National People's Congress to Comprehensively Prohibit the Illegal Trade of Wild Animals, Break the Bad Habit of Excessive Consumption of Wild Animals, and Effectively Secure the Life and Health of the People

Hong Kong 

 Emergency (Exemption from Statutory Requirements) (COVID-19) Regulation

Ireland 
 Health (Preservation and Protection and other Emergency Measures in the Public Interest) Act 2020
 Emergency Measures in the Public Interest (COVID-19) Act 2020

New Zealand
 COVID-19 Public Health Response Act 2020

Philippines 
 Bayanihan to Heal as One Act
 Bayanihan to Recover as One Act

Singapore 
 COVID-19 (Temporary Measures) Act 2020
 Revised Supplementary Supply (FY 2020) Act 2020
 Parliamentary Elections (COVID-19 Special Arrangements) Act 2020
 Constitution of the Republic of Singapore (Amendment) Act 2020
 COVID-19 (Temporary Measures for Solemnization and Registration of Marriages) Act 2020

Taiwan 
 Special Act for Prevention, Relief and Revitalization Measures for Severe Pneumonia with Novel Pathogens

United Kingdom

Primary Legislation
 Business and Planning Act 2020
 Contingencies Fund Act 2020
 Coronavirus Act 2020
 Coronavirus (Scotland) Act 2020
 Corporate Insolvency and Governance Act 2020
 Stamp Duty Land Tax (Temporary Relief) Act 2020

Significant Secondary Legislation
 Health Protection (Coronavirus) Regulations 2020
 Health Protection (Coronavirus, Restrictions) (England) Regulations 2020
 Health Protection (Coronavirus, Restrictions) (No. 2) (England) Regulations 2020
 Health Protection (Coronavirus, Restrictions) (England) (No. 3) Regulations 2020
 Health Protection (Face Coverings on Public Transport) (England) Regulations 2020
 Health Protection (Face Coverings in a Relevant Place) (England) Regulations 2020
 Health Protection (Coronavirus, International Travel) (England) Regulations 2020
 The Health Protection (Coronavirus, Restrictions) (Self-Isolation) (England) Regulations 2020
 First COVID-19 tier regulations in England
 Second COVID-19 tier regulations in England

United States 
Coronavirus Preparedness and Response Supplemental Appropriations Act, 2020 - March 2020
 Families First Coronavirus Response Act - March 2020
 Coronavirus Aid, Relief, and Economic Security Act (CARES Act) - Includes $1200 stimulus checks, March 2020
Paycheck Protection Program and Health Care Enhancement Act - April 2020
Paycheck Protection Program Flexibility Act of 2020 - June 2020
A bill to extend the authority for commitments for the paycheck protection program - July 2020
Consolidated Appropriations Act, 2021 - Includes $600 stimulus checks, December 2020
American Rescue Plan Act of 2021 - Includes $1400 stimulus checks, March 2021
Inflation Reduction Act of 2022 - August 2022

References

 
legislation